The Manitoba Major Junior Hockey League (MMJHL) is a junior ice hockey league in Manitoba, Canada.  Founded in 1970, the league was operated as an independent league. MMJHL affiliated with Hockey Manitoba and Hockey Canada in the mid-1990s. Teams compete annually for the Art Moug Trophy (regular season winner) and Jack McKenzie Trophy (playoff champion).

History
Founded in 1970, the Manitoba Major Junior Hockey League was created due to a lack of playing opportunities for Winnipeg-area players. After the restructuring of junior hockey in the country, Hockey Canada relegated the Manitoba Junior Hockey League (MJHL) from Major Junior (previously known as Tier I) to Junior 'A' (Tier II), meaning there was no active "second-tier" league in the Winnipeg area.

The new league applied to the Manitoba Amateur Hockey Association (now Hockey Manitoba) for membership and was initially accepted. When the MAHA was informed the league wanted to call itself the "Manitoba Junior 'B' Hockey League", MAHA objected on the grounds that the MJHL was in the process of constructing a developmental league for itself with that name. After negotiations between the MJHL and the new league did not work out, the league informed the MAHA that it would operate independently.

In 1977, the Canadian Amateur Hockey Association offered the league a Junior B status, instead of its requested Junior A status. Affiliation with Hockey Manitoba did happen during the mid-1990s as insurance premiums became too much for league members.

The league's first season started with the original four teams: Charleswood Hawks, Fort Garry Blues, River Heights Cardinals and Stonewall Rockets. Only a week into the season, the league was contacted by teams in Portage la Prairie and St. James who were looking for a league to play in after the MJHL's attempt to create a Junior 'B' league failed. Soon after, Neepawa approached the league also, but due to travel did not join. Instead, Neepawa participated in at least two interleague games against each team. In the second season, a team from Kenora, Ontario did this as well.

At the end of the first season, the MMJHL was allowed to send a "champion" (St. James) to compete against the MAHA Junior 'B' champion.

The Manitoba Major Junior Hockey League name comes from the league's adaptation of the Western Hockey League's player eligibility rules (permitted to roster four "over-age" 21-year-old players).

Teams

Former teams
East Kildonan Knights (1972–81)
Kern-Hill Nationals (1973–75)
Midland Flyers (1975–85)
Portage la Prairie (1970–72)
River Heights Cardinals (1970–78)
Selkirk (1972–73)
Stonewall (1970–71)
Transcona Railers (1983-2011)
Transcona Titans (1972–76)
West Kildonan Nev Knights (1972–75)

Champions

League records 

** = minimum of 12 games played

References

External links
MMJHL website

Hockey Manitoba
Ice hockey leagues in Manitoba
O Manitoba Major
1970 establishments in Manitoba